The men's basketball tournament at the 2020 Summer Olympics was the 20th edition of the event for men at the Summer Olympic Games. It was held from 25 July to 7 August 2021. All games were played at the Saitama Super Arena in Saitama, Japan.

It was originally scheduled to be held in 2020, but on 24 March 2020, the Olympics were postponed to 2021 due to the COVID-19 pandemic. Because of this pandemic, the games were played behind closed doors.

The United States won their 16th overall and fourth consecutive gold medal, after defeating France in the final. Australia won the bronze with a 107–93 win over Slovenia, winning its first medal in men's basketball after a series of losses in bronze medal games.

The medals for the competition were presented by Anita DeFrantz, United States; IOC Vice-President, Olympian, one Bronze Medal; and the medalists' bouquets were presented by Sheikh Saud Ali Al-Thani, Qatar; FIBA First-Vice President.

Format
The twelve teams were split in to three groups of four teams, and a single round-robin was held within each group. The first- and second-placed teams of each group advanced to the quarterfinals as well as the two best third-placed teams. After the preliminary round, the teams were grouped according to their results (top four and bottom four), and a draw paired teams between the groups for the quarterfinals. From there on a knockout system was used.

Schedule
The schedule of the tournament is as follows.

Qualified teams

Squads

Draw
The draw was held on 2 February 2021.

Seeding

Referees
The following 30 referees were selected for the tournament.

  Juan Fernández
  Leandro Lezcano
  Scott Beker
  James Boyer
  Ademir Zurapović
  Guilherme Locatelli
  Andreia Silva
  Matthew Kallio
  Maripier Malo
  Michael Weiland
  Yu Jung
  Maj Forsberg
  Yohan Rosso
  Ahmed Al-Shuwaili
  Manuel Mazzoni
  Takaki Kato
  Yevgeniy Mikheyev
  Mārtiņš Kozlovskis
  Rabah Noujaim
  Samir Abaakil
  Kingsley Ojeaburu
  Gizella Györgyi
  Ferdinand Pascual
  Luis Vázquez
  Aleksandar Glišić
  Luis Castillo
  Antonio Conde
  Yener Yılmaz
  Amy Bonner
  Steven Anderson

Preliminary round
All times are local (UTC+9).

In the preliminary round, teams received 2 classification points for a win, 1 classification point for a loss, and 0 classification points for a forfeit.

Group A

Group B

Group C

Third-placed teams ranking

Knockout stage
A draw after the preliminary round decided the pairings, where a seeded team played an unseeded team. The draw was held after the last group stage match on 1 August. Teams qualified were divided into two pots:

 Pot D comprised the three first-placed teams from the group phase, along with the best second-placed team.
 Pot E comprised the two remaining second-placed teams, along with the two best third-placed teams.

Draw principles:

 Each game pairing had one team from Pot D and one team from Pot E.
 Teams from the same group could not be drawn against each other in the quarterfinals.
 The second-placed team from Pot D could not be drawn against a third-placed teams from Pot E.

Ranking

Bracket

Quarterfinals

Semifinals

Bronze medal game

Gold medal game

Statistics and awards

Statistical leaders

Players

Points

Rebounds

Assists

Blocks

Steals

Efficiency

Teams

Points

Rebounds

Assists

Blocks

Steals

Efficiency

Awards
The awards were announced on 8 August 2021.

Final ranking
Rankings are determined by:
 1st–4th
 Results of gold and bronze medal games
 5th–8th:
 Win–loss record of the teams eliminated in the quarterfinals
 9th–12th:
 Teams eliminated in the preliminary round groups are classified 9th–12th based on the win–loss record in the preliminary round group.

See also
Basketball at the 2020 Summer Olympics – Women's tournament

References

 
Men's tournament